Arizona's 28th Legislative District (LD28) is one of 30 in the state, situated in central Maricopa County. The district is composed of the town of Paradise Valley and much of North Central Phoenix, including the Arcadia, Biltmore, and Sunnyslope neighborhoods. As of 2021, there are 57 precincts in the district, with a total registered voter population of 150,713. The district's overall population is 234,609.

Political representation
For the 2021–2022 Legislative Session, District 28 is represented by Christine Marsh (D) in the State Senate and by Kelli Butler (D) and Sarah Liguori (D) in the House of Representatives.

Education 

Legislative District 28 contains parts of Paradise Valley Unified School District and Scottsdale Unified School District. It also contains part of Washington Elementary School District in Glendale Union High School District as well as parts of Madison Elementary School District and Creighton Elementary School District in Phoenix Union High School District.

High schools 
 Arcadia High School
 Camelback High School
 Paradise Valley High School
 Shadow Mountain High School
 Sunnyslope High School
 Thunderbird High School (attendance area within district)
 Chaparral High School (attendance area within district)
 Washington High School (attendance area within district)

Elementary and Middle Schools 
 Campo Bello Elementary
 Cherokee Elementary
 Desert Cove Elementary
 Desert View Elementary
 Hidden Hills Elementary
 Hopi Elementary
 Indian Bend Elementary
 Kiva Elementary
 Larkspur Elementary
 Madison Heights Elementary
 Madison Rose Land Elementary
 Madison Simis Elementary
 Mercury Mine Elementary
 Moon Mountain Elementary
 Mountain View Elementary
 Palomino Primary (Pre-K–3)
 Palomino Intermediate School (4–6)
 Shaw Butte Elementary
 Sunnyslope Elementary
 Tavan Elementary
 Biltmore Preparatory Academy (K–8)
 Echo Canyon School (K–8)
 Madison Traditional Academy (K–8)
 Cocopah Middle
 Greenway Middle
 Ingleside Middle
 Madison Meadows Middle
 Madison No. 1 Middle
 Shea Middle
 Vista Verde Middle
 Orangewood Elementary (attendance area within district)
 Richard E Miller Elementary (attendance area within district)
 Sequoya Elementary (attendance area within district)
 Whispering Wind Academy (attendance area within district)
 Royal Palm Middle (attendance area within district)

Charters 
 Basis Phoenix (6–12)
 Great Hearts Academies –  Archway North Phoenix (K–6)
 Great Hearts Academies –  North Phoenix Preparatory (7–12)
 Great Hearts Academies – Veritas Preparatory (6-12)
 Montessori Academy (K–8)
 Scottsdale Country Day School (K–7)

See also
 List of Arizona Legislative Districts
 Arizona State Legislature

References

External links
  (Information based on U.S. Census Bureau's American Community Survey).
 
 

Maricopa County, Arizona
Arizona legislative districts